Melanocanthon granulifer is a species of (formerly canthonini) in the beetle family Scarabaeidae.

References

Further reading

 

Deltochilini
Articles created by Qbugbot
Beetles described in 1920